Manix Wash is a 2.5 mile long tributary stream of the Mojave River, in San Bernardino County, California.

References

Rivers of San Bernardino County, California
Mojave River